The 2014 Finnish Cup (Suomen Cup) is the 60th season of the Finnish Cup. 152 clubs entered the competition, including all sides on the top two levels of the Finnish football pyramid (Veikkausliiga and Ykkönen), 29 sides from Kakkonen and 101 from lower levels. The winner of the cup enters the qualifying rounds of the 2015–16 UEFA Europa League.

Teams

First round 
70 teams playing in the Kolmonen and lower leagues started the cup at the first round. The draw for the first and second rounds was held on 12 December 2013.

Second round 
The second round will be contested by the 35 winners from the previous round and 31 other teams playing in the Kolmonen and lower leagues, which received a bye on the first round. The draw for the first and second rounds was made on 12 December 2013.

Third round 
The 33 winners of the second round are joined in the third round by the 39 Ykkönen and Kakkonen sides. The draw for the third round was made on 5 February 2014, and the matches are scheduled to be played between 14 February and 7 March.

Notes
Note 1: TP-47 withdrew from the competition.

Fourth round 
The fourth round will be contested by the winners of the previous round and the four Veikkausliiga teams that finish last in their groups in the 2014 Finnish League Cup. The round will be drawn on 25 or 26 February, and matches will be played between 3 and 18 March.

Fifth round 
In the fifth round, the four clubs that lose in the quarter-finals of the 2014 Finnish League Cup enter the cup. The round will be drawn on 14 March, and matches will be played between 19 March and 3 April.

Sixth round 
The remaining four Veikkausliiga teams entered the cup in the sixth round. The matches were played between 15–17 April. The draw for the sixth round was held on 1 April.

Quarter-finals 
The quarter-finals will be played on 30 April 2014. The draw for the sixth round was held on 17 April.

Semi-finals 
The semi-finals will be played on 16 August 2014. The draw for the semi-finals was held on 20 May.

Final 
The final of the 2014 Finnish Cup was played on 1 November 2014.

References 

2014
Finnish Cup
Cup